James Micheal de la Rosa (born 18 November 1987) is a Mexican professional boxer. He is currently signed with Don King..

Early life
De la Rosa was born on 19 November 1987, to a Mexican father and an African-American mother.

Professional career
De la Rosa's first big win came against undefeated Abel Perry by 2nd round K.O. as the headliner of a TeleFutura card. On 3 October 2008, James gave the much feared Tim Coleman the first loss of his career. In 2010, he filed for bankruptcy, which canceled out his contracts with Duva Boxing and Cavazos Boxing. De la Rosa subsequently signed a deal with Don King's promotional company.

Personal life
De la Rosa is the brother of light middleweight boxer Juan de la Rosa, who was a contestant on The Contender.

Professional record

|- style="margin:0.5em auto; font-size:95%;"
|align="center" colspan=8|23 Wins (13 Knockouts), 5 Losses, 0 Draws
|- style="margin:0.5em auto; font-size:95%;"
|align=center style="border-style: none none solid solid; background: #e3e3e3"|Res.
|align=center style="border-style: none none solid solid; background: #e3e3e3"|Record
|align=center style="border-style: none none solid solid; background: #e3e3e3"|Opponent
|align=center style="border-style: none none solid solid; background: #e3e3e3"|Type
|align=center style="border-style: none none solid solid; background: #e3e3e3"|Rd., Time
|align=center style="border-style: none none solid solid; background: #e3e3e3"|Date
|align=center style="border-style: none none solid solid; background: #e3e3e3"|Location
|align=center style="border-style: none none solid solid; background: #e3e3e3"|Notes
|- align=center
|Loss || 23-5-0 || align=left| Curtis Stevens
|UD || 10 (10) || November 19, 2016 || align=left| T-Mobile Arena, Las Vegas, Nevada
|align=left|
|- align=center
|Loss || 23-4-0 || align=left| Jason Quigley
|UD || 10 (10) || May 7, 2016 || align=left| T-Mobile Arena, Las Vegas, Nevada
|align=left|
|-align=center
|Loss || 23-3-0 || align=left| Hugo Centeno, Jr.
|KO || 5 (10) || December 6, 2014 || align=left| Barclays Center, Brooklyn, New York
|align=left|
|-align=center
|Win || 23-2-0 || align=left| Alfredo Angulo
|UD || 10 (10) || September 13, 2014 || align=left| MGM Grand, Las Vegas, Nevada
|align=left|
|-align=center
|Win || 22-2-0 || align=left| Fabian Reyes
|TKO || 7 (8) || August 8, 2014 || align=left| Events Center, Pharr, Texas
|align=left|
|-align=center
|Loss || 21-2-0 || align=left| Marcus Wills
|MD || 8 (8) || April 4, 2013 || align=left| Treasure Island Casino, Las Vegas, Nevada
|align=left|
|-align=center
|Win || 21-1-0 || align=left|Tyrone Brunson
|UD || 8 (8) || March 23, 2012 || align=left| Convention Center, Pharr, Texas
|align=left|
|-align=center
|Loss || 20-1-0 || align=left|Allen Conyers
|UD || 10 (10) || January 11, 2011 || align=left| Silverdome, Pontiac, Michigan
|align=left|
|-align=center
|Win || 20-0-0 || align=left| Lenin Arroyo
|UD || 10 (10) || October 31, 2009 || align=left| Treasure Island Casino, Las Vegas, Nevada
|align=left|
|-align=center
|Win || 19-0-0 || align=left| Marteze Logan
|DQ || 6 (1:15) || March 28, 2009 || align=left| Harlingen Field, Harlingen, Texas
|align=left|
|-align=center
|Win || 18-0-0 || align=left| Tim Coleman
|UD || 10 (10) || October 3, 2008 || align=left| Wicomico Civic Center, Salisbury, Maryland
|align=left|
|-align=center
|Win || 17-0-0 ||align=left| Troy Wilson
|UD || 8 (8) || June 13, 2008 || align=left| Catholic Youth Center, Scranton, Pennsylvania
|align=left|
|-align=center
|Win || 16-0-0 ||align=left| James Webb
|TKO || 4 (0:43) || February 8, 2008 || align=left| Municipal Auditorium, Harlingen, Texas
|align=left|
|-align=center
|Win || 15-0-0 ||align=left| Abel Perry
|KO || 2 (0:29) || January 18, 2008 || align=left| Jacob Brown Auditorium, Brownsville, Texas
|align=left|
|-align=center
|Win || 14-0-0 ||align=left| Michael Soberanis
|TKO || 5 (2:31) || August 6, 2007 || align=left| McAllen Convention Center, McAllen, Texas
|align=left|
|-align=center
|Win || 13-0-0 || align=left| Miguel Angel Galindo
|TKO || 3 (2:53) || April 6, 2007 || align=left| Convention Center, Pharr, Texas
|align=left|
|-align=center
|Win || 12-0-0 || align=left| Francisco Rincon
|UD || 10 (10) || February 23, 2007 || align=left| Hard Rock Hotel and Casino, Las Vegas
|align=left|
|-align=center
|Win || 11-0-0 ||align=left| Frans Hantindi
|UD || 6 (6) || October 21, 2006 || align=left| Altas Palmas Park, Donna, Texas
|align=left|
|-align=center
|Win || 10-0-0 ||align=left| Carlos De la Cruz
|KO || 3 (2:35) || September 23, 2006 || align=left| Dodge Arena, Hidalgo, Texas
|align=left|
|-align=center
|Win || 9-0-0 ||align=left| David Obregón
|KO || 3 (2:00) || August 25, 2006 || align=left| Miccosukee Indian Gaming Resort, Miami
|align=left|
|-align=center
|Win || 8-0-0 ||align=left| Anthony Wilson
|TKO || 3 (2:56) || August 4, 2006 || align=left| Dodge Arena, Hidalgo, Texas
|align=left|
|-align=center
|Win || 7-0-0 || align=left| Franchie Torres
|UD || 4 (4) || May 19, 2006 || align=left| Fair Park Pavilion, Dallas
|align=left|
|-align=center
|Win || 6-0-0 || align=left| Calvin Pitts
|TKO || 2 (1:37) || May 5, 2006 || align=left| Altas Palmas Park, Donna, Texas
|align=left|
|-align=center
|Win || 5-0-0 ||align=left| Carlos Velasquez
|TKO || 1 (2:46) || March 24, 2006 || align=left| Arizona Veterans Memorial Coliseum, Phoenix, Arizona
|align=left|
|-align=center
|Win || 4-0-0 ||align=left| Andres Ramos
|TKO || 3 (1:21) || March 10, 2006 || align=left| Dodge Arena, Hidalgo, Texas
|align=left|
|-align=center
|Win || 3-0-0 ||align=left| Isidro Silva
|UD || 4 (4) || October 22, 2005 || align=left| Alta Palmas Park, Donna, Texas
|align=left|
|-align=center
|Win || 2-0-0 || align=left| Antoine Hicks
|TKO || 1 (1:36) || July 29, 2005 || align=left| Dodge Arena, Hidalgo, Texas
|align=left|
|-align=center
|Win || 1-0-0 || align=left| Francisco Reyes
|KO || 1 (1:02) || May 20, 2005 || align=left| Tlaxcala, Tlaxcala, Mexico
|align=left|
|-align=center

See also
Afro-Mexicans

References

External links

Boxers from Tamaulipas
Welterweight boxers
1987 births
Living people
Mexican male boxers
Mexican people of African-American descent